Rubens "Rubinho" Gonçalves Barrichello (born 23 May 1972) is a Brazilian professional racing driver who competed in Formula One between  and . He currently competes full-time in the Brazilian Stock Car Pro Series, driving the No. 111 Toyota Corolla E210 for Full Time Sports. He scored 11 Grand Prix wins and 68 podiums.

At the end of 2005 Barrichello left Ferrari to drive for Honda. In 2009, he finished third in the Drivers' Championship for Brawn GP, as his teammate Jenson Button won the driver's championship, and the team won the constructors' title. He was also appointed chairman of the Grand Prix Drivers' Association in 2010.

After two years with the Williams F1 team, Barrichello moved to the IndyCar Series in 2012 with KV Racing Technology. After only one year and being unable to find a ride for the 2013 season, he moved back to Brazil to participate in the Stock Car Series, winning the championship in 2014 and 2022.

In 2013 he started covering F1 race weekends for Brazil's TV Globo, interviewing drivers and team members on the grid and commentating during qualifying and race coverages.

Early life
The paternal side of his family comes from Veneto, Italy (from the town of Riese, in the province of Treviso). His maternal side of the family is of Portuguese origin. Both his father and paternal grandfather are also named Rubens, and Barrichello shares his father's birthday: 23 May. Therefore, Rubens Barrichello was known as Rubinho (Portuguese for "little Rubens"), which has become his nickname.

Barrichello won five karting titles in Brazil before going to Europe to race in the Formula Vauxhall Lotus series in 1990. In his first year, he won the championship, a feat he replicated the following year in the British Formula 3 Championship, beating David Coulthard. He very nearly joined Formula One, the highest category of single seater racing, at just 19 years of age. Instead he competed in Formula 3000 in 1992. He finished third in the championship, and joined the Jordan Formula One team for the 1993 Formula One season. During this time, and also early in his Formula One career, Barrichello lived in Cambridge, Cambridgeshire, UK.

Formula One career

Jordan (1993–1996)

He ran as high as second and was running third, having passed the Williams of Damon Hill and Alain Prost, before encountering a fuel pressure problem. His Jordan's reliability in 1993 was poor, and he finished few races. Barrichello regularly outpaced his more experienced teammates, Ivan Capelli and Thierry Boutsen. These 2 points put him in 18th place in the standings.

 started with a fourth place in Brazil and a third place at Aida, which was his first podium finish. These results put Barrichello in second place in the drivers' ranking, behind Michael Schumacher, who had won the two races. The accident knocked him unconscious and threatened his life, with his tongue blocking his airway. Barrichello credited the on-track work of Sid Watkins for saving his life. The race weekend saw a succession of serious accidents, of which two were fatal: Roland Ratzenberger died during Saturday's qualifying session when he crashed his Simtek at the curva Villeneuve, while on Sunday, during the race, Barrichello's mentor Ayrton Senna crashed his Williams at Tamburello and also died. Barrichello was deeply affected by the deaths.

His pole position at Spa-Francorchamps set the record for the youngest driver to secure pole position at that time. He concluded the season with fourth place in Adelaide. He finished the season sixth overall in the Drivers' Championship with 19 points, outscoring Irvine, who scored six.

During the  season, Barrichello scored a second-place finish in Montreal, but the Jordan cars were less reliable than in 1994 mostly because Jordan took over the works Peugeot engine contract from the McLaren team. In three races he lost seven points on the final lap—a high-speed collision with Mark Blundell at Silverstone, and mechanical failures at Barcelona and in Hungary. Barrichello finished the season in 11th with 11 points, one ahead of Irvine.

The Benson & Hedges cigarette brand brought an infusion of sponsorship to the team. Barrichello was amongst the frontrunners in Brazil, the second race of the season, before spinning off after his brakes overheated. However, as the season progressed, Jordan became less competitive. Barrichello's relationship with team owner Eddie Jordan soured during 1996, and at the end of the year, after being linked to strong teams, including Benetton (the seat was later filled by Gerhard Berger due to the Austrian bringing in more sponsorship), he left for the newly formed Stewart Grand Prix. His final season at Jordan resulted in 14 points.

Stewart (1997–1999)

Stewart's debut season in  saw frequent reliability problems, and Barrichello finished only three races. The highlight was a second-place finish in Monaco, which put him 13th in the standings. Teammate Jan Magnussen scored no points. The same year, Barrichello married Silvana Giaffone on 24 February. She is a cousin of Brazilian Indy Car driver Felipe Giaffone and a niece of the Stock Car Brasil champions, Affonso Giaffone Filho and Zeca Giaffone.

 was not much better for Stewart, with two fifth places being the team's best results.

 was a much better year for the Stewart team. Barrichello qualified third at his home race in Brazil, outpacing Michael Schumacher's Ferrari, and led some laps, until his engine blew near 'Subida dos Boxes'. He also took pole position in the wet qualifying session in France, and three podium finishes, at the San Marino, French, and European Grands Prix. The latter race was won by his teammate Johnny Herbert. Despite this, Barrichello again generally outpaced his teammate. Over the course of the year, he caught the eye of Ferrari boss Jean Todt, and he was signed for the  season.

Ferrari (2000–2005)

This risky call saw him leap-frog the McLarens who chose to pit for wet weather tyres to win the race, having started from 18th on the grid. This was the longest any driver in Formula One history had waited for a maiden Grand Prix win at the time. Barrichello had a consistent debut season for Ferrari, finishing most races on the podium, but was outscored by Michael Schumacher, Mika Häkkinen and David Coulthard. Barrichello finished the season ranked fourth after supporting Schumacher as he battled and defeated Häkkinen for the Drivers' Championship, and helping Ferrari win the Constructors' Championship.

Barrichello finished the  season in third place, achieving a total of 10 podium finishes and scoring a total of 56 championship points. He nearly achieved a win in Monza, in which the Ferrari pit crew performed badly. He finished the season winless, and again he played a major supporting role for Schumacher, helping him win his second Drivers' Championship with Ferrari and helping the team win the Constructors' Championship for the third consecutive year.

Schumacher exchanged podium places with Barrichello at the podium ceremony and gave Barrichello the winner's trophy.

Barrichello finished the  season in fourth place, scoring 65 points, including wins at Silverstone and Suzuka, and again played a crucial role in helping Schumacher and Ferrari win the drivers' and Constructors' Championships. In the  season, Barrichello finished second behind Schumacher in only seven of the first thirteen races, but he won both the 2004 Italian Grand Prix and the 2004 Chinese Grand Prix to clinch second place in the championship, finishing the year with 114 points and 14 podiums. Though Barrichello had good cars during his Ferrari era, his best result at his home race was a third place in 2004. He failed to finish eleven of the fifteen Brazilian Grands Prix in which he has competed.

In the  season, Ferrari lacked the pace of previous years because of the changing of tyre rules. Ferrari used Bridgestone tyres, which were less effective than those of their competitors Michelin. He finished the season in eighth place in the drivers' standings with 38 points, his worst season with Ferrari.

In an August 2022 interview with Felipe Massa, he states that Barrichello had a contract with Ferrari running until 2006, after which he was to be replaced with Kimi Raikkonen for the 2007 season. But in early 2005, Honda had approached him to drive for them, and unhappy with the treatment Ferrari had given him, decided to ask the team to terminate his contract in 2005. He was thus replaced by Felipe for the 2006 season.

Honda (2006–2008)

In August 2005 he announced that he would be leaving Ferrari at the end of the year to join Honda. Barrichello's lucky number is "11," which was the number his kart bore when he won his first race. In , his new teammate Jenson Button gave Barrichello the number for his car in goodwill. Barrichello was initially outpaced by Button, and claimed that the car did not suit his driving style, particularly under braking. After modifications to the car he was able to be more competitive. In Monaco, he nearly got his first podium with the team, but then he was given a drive-through penalty for speeding in the pit lane and finished fourth. Though he lost a podium, it was the best result at the Monaco Grand Prix for Honda (as a team) or any Japanese team. For the race Barrichello exchanged helmet liveries with Tony Kanaan, a Brazilian Indy Car driver and one of his best friends. On the same weekend, Kanaan raced in the 2006 Indianapolis 500 race using Barrichello's helmet livery. He finished the season seventh in the drivers' standings with 30 points, 26 behind Button.

Barrichello did not score any points during the 2007 season, because of the Honda RA107's lack of pace. Despite retiring only twice, a ninth place in the British Grand Prix was his best result of the season and he only once qualified in the top 10. Despite this, Honda confirmed on 19 July 2007, that Barrichello would remain with the team as a race driver for the  season. This gave him the opportunity of making the five race starts he required to break Riccardo Patrese's record for the driver that has started the most Grands Prix, a record that had stood for 14 years.

In the first race of the 2008 season, Barrichello qualified 10th, ahead of Button. He finished 6th but was disqualified for ignoring a red light at the pit exit. He also received a stop-and-go penalty during the race for entering the pits while they were closed during a safety car period. In Malaysia, gearbox problems limited his performance and he finished 13th. In Bahrain he again finished out of the points.

The  was Barrichello's 257th Grand Prix, breaking Patrese's record of 256 Grand Prix starts and becoming the most experienced driver in F1 history. The particular Grand Prix at which he broke this record has been disputed, as he technically did not start some races, such as the 2002 Spanish Grand Prix, but Barrichello and Honda chose Turkey to be the location of the official celebrations.

In Monaco, he scored his first points since 2006 and in Canada he scored consecutive points, finishing 7th after starting in 9th position. He led some laps because of the appearance of the safety car, but fell back down the order towards the end of the race. At Magny-Cours, Barrichello did not repeat his performance from the two previous races and qualified in 17th. After a gearbox change, he dropped to 20th. In the race, he finished 14th.

At Silverstone, which he said he considers to be his second home, he qualified 16th, outpacing Button. With heavy rain on race day, through good use of an extreme wet tyre he finished 3rd, achieving his first podium since 2005. However, in Germany, a collision with David Coulthard ended his hopes for points. In Hungary, he was lapped by the leader, repeating the same performance in Valencia. In Belgium he qualified 16th but had to retire because of a gearbox fault. At a wet Monza, he was second-fastest in Friday practice and started from 16th on the grid. He managed to get up to 9th but as a result of using the wrong type of tyre in his second pit stop he ended up 17th. At the first ever night race in Singapore he was in a good position to score some points after pitting before the pit lane closed for the safety car period, but shortly afterwards the engine failed and he had to retire. In Japan he started from 17th on the grid, but managed to get up to 13th by the end of the race. In China he managed to get into Q2 for the first time in ten races, and would have started 14th. But after Mark Webber had his ten place penalty for an engine change added he was moved up to 13th. On race day he had a good start, and got up to 10th early on and held a strong mid-table position all race and finished 11th, five places ahead of Button, who had struggled all weekend.

At his home Grand Prix in Brazil, he was sporting an alternative helmet design in tribute to Ingo Hoffmann, and finished 15th.

On 5 December 2008 Honda announced that they were quitting F1, because of the economic crisis. This led to months of uncertainty as to whether a buyer could be found, and whether they would retain Barrichello.

Brawn GP (2009)

Just weeks before the season opener in Melbourne, team manager Ross Brawn purchased the Honda team, renaming it Brawn GP and removing the threat of possible closure. Barrichello was the subject of persistent rumours suggesting he would lose his seat to the young Bruno Senna, nephew of his friend, idol and mentor Ayrton Senna. Ultimately Brawn elected to retain Barrichello to partner Jenson Button in 2009. At Barcelona during the final pre-season test, both Barrichello and Button surprised the paddock with extremely competitive lap times, outperforming others by as much as two seconds, and foreshadowing the performance the team would show in the early races.

In Melbourne, Barrichello topped the timesheets in the first two elements of qualifying, but qualified second on the grid behind teammate Button. Despite a poor start caused by his engine slipping into anti-stall, he did well to recover and lost only a couple of positions at the start. However, he sustained damage to the front wing and rear diffuser in the first corner incident when he was bumped from behind by Heikki Kovalainen in his McLaren that saw him hit Mark Webber in the Red Bull damaging Webber's car as well as his hopes of a good finish. Despite this, Barrichello ultimately finished the race in second place after Sebastian Vettel and Robert Kubica collided with just 2 laps remaining. He started eighth in Malaysia after getting a grid penalty for a gearbox change and finished the race in fifth place after the race was abandoned at Sepang due to heavy rain.

At Shanghai, he outpaced Button in qualifying, but struggled with his car's brakes when one of them stopped working in the first stint and finished in fourth, recording the race's fastest lap. In Bahrain, his front wing adjustor failed during his qualifying run thereby compromising his aggressive 3-pit-stop race strategy, and thus managed only fifth place. He was unable to capitalise on his three-stop strategy as a result of a lack of pace caused by massive amounts of understeer on his third set of tyres in his third stint, finishing behind Button, who changed to a 2-stop strategy during the race.

At Monaco, Barrichello was pipped for pole by a late-charging Button and Ferrari's Kimi Räikkönen. A good start saw him leapfrog the Finn into Sainte Devote. Barrichello's supersoft tyres did not last as well as Button's in the first stint and he pitted earlier than planned, and Button took a commanding lead. The top three remained unchanged for the duration of the race, save some reshuffling during the pit stop windows. At the completion of lap 47, Barrichello became the driver who has completed most laps in Formula One history, surpassing Michael Schumacher's total of 13,909 laps. In Turkey, he again had gearbox problems and retired for the first time in the season, leaving Button to increase his points advantage, while in Britain, Barrichello qualified second behind Vettel, before beating Button for the first time in 2009 en route to third place.

In Germany, Barrichello took the lead at the first corner but after his first stop, he came out behind Felipe Massa who held him up. A fuel rig problem during his second stop meant that he finished the race in sixth, a place behind teammate Jenson Button. After the race he publicly blamed Brawn GP saying "It was a good show from the team in how to lose a race" and "They made me lose the race". Team principal Ross Brawn said of the incident "He had the 11th-fastest time of the race. You can't win a race with that speed". However, he refused to criticize Barrichello for his outburst. Barrichello has since admitted he overreacted, and he would not have won as the Red Bull cars were half a second a lap quicker than him.

In Hungary, the Brawn cars struggled and lacked pace because of problems with the tyres and aerodynamics. Barrichello finished 10th, his first finish outside the points in 2009, and three places behind Button. In Valencia, Barrichello took his 10th Grand Prix win, his first in five years and the 100th win by a Brazilian driver in Formula One, allowing him to move up to 2nd in the Championship. He paid tribute to injured compatriot Felipe Massa with a plaque on the top of his race helmet.

At Spa, he qualified 4th, but suffered from anti-stall for the third time in 2009 and he found himself last, but missed the first lap crash which took out four drivers including teammate Button. While the safety car was out he pitted and changed strategy which enabled him to climb back up to 7th. During the last three laps the car had an engine oil leak, but he still managed to finish, before his car caught fire in the pit lane after the race. At Monza, he qualified 5th, despite carrying more fuel to try a different strategy with only one stop. After passing Kovalainen at the start, Barrichello managed not to lose too much time, as he had the advantage of just one stop against Hamilton, Räikkönen and Sutil's two-stop strategy. By Hamilton's second pit stop, Button and Barrichello were running first and second. Hamilton tried to pressure Button by forcing his car, but on the last lap he crashed, giving third place to Räikkönen, and fourth to Sutil. Barrichello won the 11th race in his Formula One career, and gained more points on Button in their fight for the world title.

In Singapore, he had to change his gearbox and take a five place grid penalty. During qualifying he crashed his car while in fifth place. As a result of Nick Heidfeld starting from the pitlane, Barrichello would start 9th and finished sixth, while Button finished fifth. In Japan, he originally qualified 5th, but was given a five place grid penalty for failing to slow down during a yellow flag situation near the end of Q2 when Sébastien Buemi crashed. He was on course to finish fifth with Button behind, which would have been enough for Brawn GP to clinch the Constructors' Championship, but a safety car period in the closing stages of the race for Jaime Alguersuari's crash meant that Nico Rosberg and Heidfeld were able to stay out ahead and save fuel, dropping Barrichello to seventh. With Button finishing eighth, Barrichello closed the points deficit to fourteen and putting Brawn almost out of reach for the Constructors' title.

In Brazil, Barrichello claimed pole in a rain-soaked, qualifying session with title rivals Button and Vettel down the order in 14th and 16th, respectively. A puncture cost Barrichello a chance of taking the title to the final race, as he failed to secure enough of an advantage over Button to do so. Button finished fifth to become champion. In Abu Dhabi he qualified and finished 4th. With Vettel winning the race, he secured second in the standings, with Barrichello finishing third in the championship with 77 points.

Williams (2010–2011)

In 2010, Barrichello was offered a contract by McLaren. He did not accept because he had already signed a contract with Williams, and did not want to renege on his pledge to that team. The McLaren seat was ultimately filled by Barrichello's 2009 teammate Jenson Button. On 2 November 2009, Williams confirmed Barrichello and Nico Hülkenberg as their official race drivers for the  season. This meant that Barrichello would be in Formula One for at least another season, and would go on to become the first driver in Formula One history to compete in over 300 Grands Prix.

In pre-season testing, Barrichello finished at the top of the timesheets once, because of rain. In some sessions, he was outpaced by his rookie teammate Hülkenberg. Williams was the second team in terms of kilometres covered and showed some reliability, but were off pace from front-runners Red Bull, Ferrari, and McLaren.

At the first race of the season in Bahrain, Barrichello qualified eleventh on the grid, and finished tenth in the race. In Australia, he went on to finish eighth, moving him to within two points of Senna's mark. He stalled on the grid in Malaysia due to an overheating clutch, but recovered to twelfth place at the finish. In China, he finished twelfth again. In Spain he benefited from Lewis Hamilton's late crash to score two points, finishing in 9th, despite starting 18th on the grid and equalling Senna's record.

In Monaco, he qualified ninth and moved up to sixth position through the first corner. Later, he had a suspension failure caused by a loose drain cover and crashed heavily. After crashing he threw the car's steering wheel out, as he was sitting in the middle of a 120 mph corner with his car on fire. This was then run over by Karun Chandhok's Hispania.

Due to an overheating clutch at the start, he dropped down to 20th position. A poor pit stop failed to help his cause and he finished in fourteenth position. He qualified eleventh, narrowly missing Q3 but his anti-stall system kicked in at the start of the race. After recovering well, he later collided with Jaime Alguersuari when Alguersuari came across too late to cover his line, the damage blocking Barrichello's left brake duct.

In Valencia, the Williams team brought big upgrades and ran their version of the F-duct. Barrichello qualified ninth with the same time as his teammate Hülkenberg. He was running seventh when the safety car was deployed at the end of lap nine, and pulled straight into the pits. When the safety car pitted he was able to fend off Kubica to finish fourth, his highest finish so far of the season. Post-race, nine cars were investigated for speeding under the safety car, and were later given a five-second penalty. He added further points to his total with fifth at Silverstone, and tenth in Hungary, with a twelfth at Hockenheim in between.

Before the race, he was elected as Chairman of the Grand Prix Drivers' Association to replace the outgoing Nick Heidfeld.

At Monza, he qualified in tenth, and had a rather lonely run in the race to finish in the same place to score another point. In Singapore, the FW32 sported a new front wing, and Barrichello put this to good use to set the sixth fastest time in qualifying, although Williams technical director Sam Michael reckoned the car was fast enough to be a couple of positions higher. In the race despite losing places to Robert Kubica and Nico Rosberg at the start, Barrichello had a solid run to sixth at the finish. In Japan, he qualified in a strong seventh, he raced strongly before fading to ninth as he was overtaken by the two Saubers towards the closing stages of the race.

In Korea he qualified tenth despite being blocked by Michael Schumacher. In a wet race he suffered heavy tyre wear on the intermediates that he was running on, and in the closing stages of the race he was passed by Robert Kubica and Vitantonio Liuzzi, dropping him to seventh place at the finish. At Interlagos he qualified a strong sixth in variable conditions with teammate Hülkenberg starting from pole position. After a delayed pitstop, his traditional bad luck on home soil returned when he suffered a puncture after briefly colliding with Jaime Alguersuari, costing him any chance of scoring points. In Abu Dhabi he again qualified strongly in seventh place, and maintained that position shortly after the start. However, when the safety car was deployed following Michael Schumacher's and Vitantonio Liuzzi's crash, many drivers like Robert Kubica, Vitaly Petrov and Nico Rosberg took advantage of this by pitting early. This had a negative effect as they did not need to pit again, and Barrichello finished outside of the points.

On 15 November 2010, Williams confirmed Barrichello as one of the team's drivers for the  season. His teammate in 2011 was Pastor Maldonado.

In Australia he retired with a transmission problem. He retired again in Malaysia with leaking hydraulics. He finished outside the points in the next three races before a pair of ninth places in Monaco and Canada. He came twelfth in Valencia, and thirteenth in Britain, but retired in Germany because of an oil leak. After that, he finished every race outside the points, but made no further retirements. His final race at the 2011 Brazilian Grand Prix was a quiet farewell where he finished 14th, ahead of former teammate Michael Schumacher.

In a 2022 interview, Barrichello revealed he was fired by Frank Williams through a phone call in early January 2012, and on 17 January 2012, Williams confirmed that Bruno Senna would replace Barrichello at Williams for the  season. Senna was chosen due to his financial backing.

Planned comeback with Caterham (2014)
Former Caterham F1 team principal Manfredi Ravetto said in an interview that a contract was signed with Barrichello to replace Kamui Kobayashi for the final three races of the season, providing the car would be competitive. It was not, and the Caterham team went into administration, so Barrichello did not join the team.

IndyCar career
On 25 January 2012, American journalist Robin Miller reported that Barrichello was to test an IndyCar for KV Racing Technology with friend Tony Kanaan. The test was held at Sebring over 30–31 January and 1 February. He also tested for the team at Infineon Raceway in late February.

On 1 March 2012 Barrichello joined KV Racing Technology for the 2012 season, to drive the team's number eight entry alongside Kanaan and E. J. Viso, sponsored by Brazilian construction company, Embrase. Barrichello raced in his first Indianapolis 500 on 27 May 2012. He led a total of two laps and finished 11th, and in doing so won the 2012 Indianapolis 500 Rookie of the Year title. During the rest of the season he took two top six finishes, and finished the year in 12th position in the championship.

South America

Barrichello joined a Peugeot team of the Brazilian racing series Stock Car Brasil for the final three races of the 2012 season as a guest driver. Since 2013 he drives a Chevrolet as a regular member of the Full Time Sports team. Since Nonô Figueiredo already used the number 11, Barrichello's lucky number, he chose 111 instead. In the 2013 season, he finished the season in 8th place overall, with a best race result was a second-place finish.

Continuing to drive a Chevrolet for Full Time Sports in 2014, Barrichello was crowned the 2014 champion, winning two races and securing a further 4 podium finishes. This was Barrichello's first championship in 23 years, dating back to his 1991 British Formula 3 title. In 2015, Barrichello finished in 4th place overall. In 2016 he claimed three wins and nine podiums, finishing second overall behind Felipe Fraga. The driver finished 5th in 2017, 4th in 2018 and 5th in 2019, earning multiple wins each year.

In 2020, Toyota sent him to Argentina to compete in the Super TC 2000 and Top Race V6 championships.

Helmet

Barrichello's helmet is white with an orange-red oval shape on the rear, an orange-red shape around the visor, an orange red line under the helmet and a blue circle on the top with azure and sky blue cylinders—similar to those on the helmet of former world champion Emerson Fittipaldi—with a golden star in the middle (usually five-pointed, although the recent designs had it six-pointed). The white part of the helmet changed to silver for some races during the 1999 season. After signing for Ferrari in 2000, teammate Michael Schumacher changed the colours of his helmet at the Monaco Grand Prix to avoid confusion, since the two drivers' original helmet colours were identical (the only real difference being that Schumacher's helmet had a red band which wrapped around its back from the visor, fading into gold and back).

At the 2001 Brazilian Grand Prix, the oval shape and the shape around the visor were painted to resemble the Brazilian flag, and at his 300th Grand Prix, his helmet once again carried the Brazilian flag colours. At the 2006 Monaco Grand Prix he had the helmet livery of fellow Brazilian and good friend Tony Kanaan, who in turn had Barrichello's helmet livery while racing in 2006 Indianapolis 500 which was held on the same day because they said it would be the closest either of them would get to competing in the biggest race of the year of the category the other raced in. At the 2008 Brazilian Grand Prix, Barrichello drove with a helmet in tribute to Ingo Hoffmann, former F1 driver and multiple Stock Car Brasil champion who was retiring that year. At the 1995 and 2011 Brazilian Grands Prix, he wore a helmet painted to include elements of his own helmet design, and the classic design of Ayrton Senna's helmet.

During the 2009 season he used the Brawn GP fluorescent colours on his helmet.

Racing record

Career summary

† As Barrichello was a guest driver, he was ineligible to score points.
* Season still in progress.

Complete British Formula Three Championship results
(key) (Races in bold indicate pole position) (Races in italics indicate fastest lap)

Complete International Formula 3000 results
(key) (Races in bold indicate pole position; results in italics indicate fastest lap)

Complete Formula One results
(key) (Races in bold indicate pole position; results in italics indicate fastest lap)

 Driver did not finish the Grand Prix, but was classified as he completed over 90% of the race distance.

 Half-points awarded as less than 75% of race distance was completed.

Complete IndyCar Series results
(key)

 ** Podium (Non-win) indicates 2nd- or 3rd-place finishes
 *** Top 10s (Non-podium) indicates 4th- through 10th-place finishes

Indianapolis 500

Complete Stock Car Brasil results
(key) (Races in bold indicate pole position; results in italics indicate fastest lap)

‡ Ineligible for championship points.
† Driver did not finish the race, but was classified as he completed over 90% of the race distance.

Complete IMSA SportsCar Championship results
(key) (Races in bold indicate pole position; results in italics indicate fastest lap)

24 Hours of Daytona

24 Hours of Le Mans

Personal life
Barrichello lives in São Paulo. For commuting between races, Barrichello owned an Embraer Legacy 600 (s/n 14500802).

Barrichello formerly held the fastest time by a Formula One driver around the Top Gear test track during the show's Star in a Reasonably Priced Car segment. His lap time of 1:44.3 put him ahead of the Stig by 0.1 seconds. This led to Jeremy Clarkson making frequent references to the Stig developing a deep-seated hatred of Barrichello.

In February 2018, Barrichello was rushed to hospital after suffering headaches where it was discovered that he had a benign tumour which was later removed.
On F1's podcast, "Beyond The Grid", he revealed he got divorced in 2019.

Barrichello's son Eduardo Barrichello is also a racing driver, currently competing in the Formula Regional European Championship.

References

External links

 
 
 
Rubens Barrichello at Driver Database

1972 births
Living people
Racing drivers from São Paulo
Brazilian racing drivers
Brazilian people of Italian descent
Brazilian Formula One drivers
Brazilian IndyCar Series drivers
British Formula Three Championship drivers
International Formula 3000 drivers
EFDA Nations Cup drivers
Brazilian expatriates in Monaco
Brazilian expatriates in Portugal
Brazilian expatriate sportspeople in England
Stock Car Brasil drivers
Jordan Formula One drivers
Stewart Formula One drivers
Ferrari Formula One drivers
Honda Formula One drivers
Brawn Formula One drivers
Williams Formula One drivers
Formula One race winners
IndyCar Series drivers
Indianapolis 500 drivers
Indianapolis 500 Rookies of the Year
24 Hours of Daytona drivers
Rolex Sports Car Series drivers
Brazilian WeatherTech SportsCar Championship drivers
24 Hours of Le Mans drivers
Karting World Championship drivers
Súper TC 2000 drivers
Toyota Gazoo Racing drivers
Racing Team Nederland drivers
Blancpain Endurance Series drivers
Strakka Racing drivers
JDC Motorsports drivers
Wayne Taylor Racing drivers
Starworks Motorsport drivers
KV Racing Technology drivers
Draco Racing drivers
Formula 3 Sudamericana drivers